Barra de São Miguel (São Miguel being Portuguese for Saint Michael) may refer to:

Barra de São Miguel, Alagoas, a municipality of Alagoas, Brazil
Barra de São Miguel, Paraíba, a municipality of Paraíba, Brazil